International Finance is a peer-reviewed academic journal aimed at covering theory and policy in macroeconomics and finance. The founding editor-in-chief is Benn Steil (Council on Foreign Relations).

External links 
 

Finance journals
Publications established in 1998
Wiley-Blackwell academic journals
English-language journals
Triannual journals